"Go to Hell" (stylised in all capitals) is a song by Australian singer Clinton Kane, released on 3 December 2021 as the third single from his forthcoming second EP, Maybe Someday It'll All Be OK.

Background and release
On 1 September 2021, Kane posted on twitter "ahaha just wrote a song and one of the line says why dont u take him and go to hell". Kane continued to tease the rock song on social media for a while and on 2 December 2021, Kane posted on twitter announcing the song's release at "midnight tonight".

Reception
Daily Tribune said "'Go to Hell' leans more on the alternative rock leaning edge, a completely different genre from Kane's previous works." Hailey Hastings of Honey Pop said "The track has out-of-this-world vocals and is the start of an all-new era for an artist we simply can not get enough of."

Charts

References

2021 songs
2021 singles
Clinton Kane songs
Columbia Records singles
Songs written by Clinton Kane
Sony Music singles